Carl Cronstedt may refer to:

 Carl Johan Cronstedt (1709–1779), Swedish architect, inventor, scientist and bibliophile
 Carl Olof Cronstedt (1756–1820), Swedish naval commander